South Tottenham is a railway station on the east–west Gospel Oak to Barking Line of the London Overground. It is in Zone 3, in the London Borough of Haringey.
South Tottenham to  station (on the western, Seven Sisters Branch of the Lea Valley Lines and on the London Underground Victoria line) is considered an official out-of-station interchange by the National Rail timetable, and involves a short walk. This link will become fixed under the planned route for Crossrail 2, which sees a double-ended underground station built linking together South Tottenham and Seven Sisters stations.

History 

Opened as 'South Tottenham and Stamford Hill' station on 1 May 1871, on the Tottenham and Hampstead Junction Railway, it was renamed 'South Tottenham' in 1949.

The station today 

A short distance west of the station, on the far side of the A10, there is a single east-to-north spur towards Seven Sisters. To allow this to be reached by westbound trains, there is a facing crossover, located in the platform area.

A short distance to the east of the station, there is a double turnout branching to the south, to reach the eastern route of the two north–south Lea Valley Lines. Visually from the platforms, this looks like it is the main line, since the main tracks curve to the north from the junction. (In fact, it was the original main line, since the Tottenham and Forest Gate Railway eastwards was a later addition.)

Both curves were formerly part of the route used by trains on the Palace Gates Line (which then continued onwards to ) but these days see infrequent use, with just one booked London Overground train, which travels between Liverpool Street and  via  and Seven Sisters, in one direction only. However, this train is susceptible to diversion and has not run via South Tottenham since 21 August 2018, and looks unlikely to resume soon. This surviving parliamentary train does not however stop at South Tottenham.

The station has been receiving investment, following station management passing to London Overground in 2007.

Connections
The station is served by London Buses routes 76, 149, 243, 318, 349, 476 and night route N73.

Services

A basic 15-minute interval service (4 train per hour) operates from the station in both directions throughout the week (including Sundays), with one additional a.m peak period service to  Low Level on weekdays only.

References

External links

South Tottenham Station in the 1960s on Flickr

Railway stations in the London Borough of Haringey
DfT Category E stations
Former Tottenham and Hampstead Junction Railway stations
Railway stations in Great Britain opened in 1871
Railway stations served by London Overground